Copper Mountain is a  mountain summit located in the southeast portion of the Olympic Mountains, in Mason County of Washington state. It is situated on the boundary shared by Daniel J. Evans Wilderness and Mount Skokomish Wilderness, as well as the shared common border of Olympic National Park with Olympic National Forest. The nearest higher neighbor is Mount Ellinor,  to the east. Wagonwheel Lake lies immediately north of the peak. Precipitation runoff from the mountain drains north into the Hamma Hamma River, and south into the North Fork Skokomish River, thence Lake Cushman.

Climate

Copper Mountain is located in the marine west coast climate zone of western North America. Most weather fronts originate in the Pacific Ocean, and travel east toward the Olympic Mountains. As fronts approach, they are forced upward by the peaks of the Olympic Range, causing them to drop their moisture in the form of rain or snowfall (Orographic lift). As a result, the Olympics experience high precipitation, especially during the winter months. During winter months, weather is usually cloudy, but due to high pressure systems over the Pacific Ocean that intensify during summer months, there is often little or no cloud cover during the summer. Because of maritime influence, snow tends to be wet and heavy, resulting in avalanche danger. The months April through October offer the most favorable weather for climbing or viewing.

Etymology

The mountain was named on July 7, 1890, by Lieutenant Joseph P. O'Neil (1863–1938), United States Army officer who led the 1885 and 1890 O'Neil Expeditions to explore the interior of the Olympic Mountains. Earlier that same year, prospectors had discovered copper ore on the mountain.

Geology

The Olympic Mountains are composed of obducted clastic wedge material and oceanic crust, primarily Eocene sandstone, turbidite, and basaltic oceanic crust. The mountains were sculpted during the Pleistocene era by erosion and glaciers advancing and retreating multiple times.

Gallery

See also

 Geology of the Pacific Northwest
 Olympic Mountains

References

External links

 
 Mount Skokomish Wilderness U.S. Forest Service
 Copper Mountain / East Ridge: The Mountaineers

Olympic Mountains
Landforms of Mason County, Washington
Mountains of Washington (state)
Olympic National Forest
North American 1000 m summits
Olympic National Park